Cardiocondyla zoserka is a species of ant in the genus Cardiocondyla. It is native to Nigeria.

References

Myrmicinae
Hymenoptera of Africa
Insects of West Africa
Endemic fauna of Nigeria
Insects described in 1982
Taxonomy articles created by Polbot